The Chochenyo  (also called Chocheño, Chocenyo) are one of the divisions of the indigenous Ohlone (Costanoan) people  of Northern California. The Chochenyo reside on the east side of the San Francisco Bay (the East Bay), primarily in what is now Alameda County, and also Contra Costa County, from the Berkeley Hills inland to the western Diablo Range.

Chochenyo (also called Chocheño and East Bay Costanoan) is also the name of their spoken language, one of the Costanoan dialects in the Utian family. Linguistically, Chochenyo, Tamyen (also Tamien) and Ramaytush are thought to be close dialects of a single language.

The Ohlone tribes were hunter-gatherers who moved into the San Francisco Bay Region around 500 CE, displacing earlier Esselen people. In Chochenyo territory, datings of the ancient Newark Shellmound, West Berkeley Shellmound, and Emeryville Shellmound attest to people residing in the Bay Area since 4000 BCE.

Chochenyo territory was bordered by the Karkin to the north (at Mount Diablo), the Tamyen to the south and southwest, the San Francisco Bay to the west, and overlapped a bit with the Bay Miwok and Yokuts to the east.

During the California Mission Era, the Chochenyos moved en masse to the Mission San Francisco de Asís (founded in 1776) in San Francisco, and Mission San José of Fremont (founded in 1797). Most moved into one of these missions and were baptized, lived and educated to be Catholic neophytes, also known as Mission Indians, until the missions were discontinued by the Mexican Government in 1834. Then the people found themselves landless.  A large majority of the Chochenyo died from disease in the missions and shortly thereafter, only a fragment remaining by 1900. The speech of the last two native speakers of Chochenyo was documented in the 1920s in the unpublished fieldnotes of the Bureau of American Ethnology linguist John Peabody Harrington.

Today, the Chochenyo have joined with the other San Francisco Bay Area Ohlone people under the name of the Muwekma Ohlone Tribe. As of 2007, Muwekma Ohlone were petitioning for U.S. federal recognition.

Chochenyo tribes and villages
The East Bay and eastward mountain valleys were populated with dozens of Chochenyo tribes and villages. See:

 Ohlone tribes and villages, East Bay Area

See also 

 Sogorea Te Land Trust
 Chochenyo Park

References 

 Kroeber, Alfred L. 1925. Handbook of the Indians of California. Washington, D.C: Bureau of American Ethnology Bulletin No. 78. (map of villages, page 465)
 Milliken, Randall. A Time of Little Choice: The Disintegration of Tribal Culture in the San Francisco Bay Area 1769-1910 Menlo Park, CA: Ballena Press Publication, 1995.  (alk. paper)
 Milliken, Randall. Native Americans at Mission San Jose Banning, CA: Malki-Ballena Press Publication, 2008.  (alk. paper)
 Teixeira, Lauren. The Costanoan/Ohlone Indians of the San Francisco and Monterey Bay Area, A Research Guide. Menlo Park, CA: Ballena Press Publication, 1997. .

External links
 Chochenyo revival ("Release")
 Chochenyo revitalization – language at UCB "Faith in Words" 2004 archived version
 Chochenyo language overview at the Survey of California and Other Indian Languages
 Muwekma Ohlone Tribe website
 Muwekma request for federal tribal recognition Court opinion 9/21/06
 The Muwekma Ohlone Tribe of the San Francisco Bay Area

Ohlone
Native American tribes in California
California Mission Indians
History of Alameda County, California
History of Contra Costa County, California
Berkeley Hills
Diablo Range
Culture in the San Francisco Bay Area
History of the San Francisco Bay Area